The 2022 Challenger di Roseto degli Abruzzi II was a professional tennis tournament played on clay courts. It was the second edition of the tournament which was part of the 2022 ATP Challenger Tour. It took place in Roseto degli Abruzzi, Italy between 14 and 20 March 2022.

Singles main-draw entrants

Seeds

 1 Rankings are as of 7 March 2022.

Other entrants
The following players received wildcards into the singles main draw:
  Flavio Cobolli
  Andrea Del Federico
  Giulio Zeppieri

The following players received entry into the singles main draw as alternates:
  Mathias Bourgue
  Manuel Guinard
  Brayden Schnur
  Nino Serdarušić

The following players received entry from the qualifying draw:
  Luciano Darderi
  Alexis Gautier
  Carlos Gimeno Valero
  Zsombor Piros
  Andrea Vavassori
  Louis Wessels

The following players received entry as lucky losers:
  Nicolás Álvarez Varona
  Robin Haase

Champions

Singles

  Manuel Guinard def.  Tseng Chun-hsin 6–1, 6–2.

Doubles

  Franco Agamenone /  Manuel Guinard def.  Ivan Sabanov /  Matej Sabanov 7–6(7–2), 7–6(7–3).

References

2022 ATP Challenger Tour
March 2022 sports events in Italy
2022 in Italian sport